Higinio Marín Escavy (born 19 October 1993), simply known as Higinio, is a Spanish professional footballer who plays as a forward for Albacete.

Club career
Born in Calasparra, Murcia, Higinio graduated from local Real Murcia's youth system, making his senior debuts with the reserves in the 2011–12 campaign, in Tercera División. On 15 September 2012 he played his first match as a professional, coming on as a late substitute in a 2–2 home draw against CD Mirandés in the Segunda División championship.

On 2 July 2014 Higinio joined Cultural y Deportiva Leonesa, in Segunda División B. Two months later, however, he left the club and joined La Hoya Lorca CF, also in the third level.

Higinio subsequently represented UCAM Murcia CF and Real Valladolid B in the third division, netting 13 goals for the latter during the 2016–17 season. On 20 June 2017, he returned to the second level after agreeing to a contract with CD Numancia.

Higinio scored ten goals for Numancia in the 2019–20 campaign, as the club suffered relegation. On 12 August 2020, he moved abroad for the first time in his career after signing for Bulgarian side PFC Ludogorets Razgrad.  After a bright start for Ludogorets, a serious injury (broken ankle) sustained towards the end of 2020 kept him out of action for a long time.

On 28 February 2022, after being rarely used, Higinio was loaned to Polish side Górnik Zabrze for the remainder of the campaign. On 27 July, he returned to his home country after signing a three-year contract with Albacete Balompié in division two.

References

External links

1993 births
Living people
Spanish footballers
Footballers from the Region of Murcia
Association football forwards
Segunda División players
Segunda División B players
Tercera División players
First Professional Football League (Bulgaria) players
Ekstraklasa players
Real Murcia players
Cultural Leonesa footballers
Lorca FC players
UCAM Murcia CF players
Real Valladolid Promesas players
CD Numancia players
Albacete Balompié players
PFC Ludogorets Razgrad players
Górnik Zabrze players
Spanish expatriate footballers
Expatriate footballers in Bulgaria
Expatriate footballers in Poland
Spanish expatriate sportspeople in Bulgaria
Spanish expatriate sportspeople in Poland